Rafael Chávez may refer to:

Sportsmen

Rafael Chávez (Costa Rican footballer) in 2011 FIFA U-20 World Cup squads
Rafael Chávez (Mexican footballer), recipient of Balón de Oro (Mexico)

Politicians

Rafael Diaz Chávez, Vice President of Honduras
Rafael Chávez (Mexican politician), Governor of San Luis Potosí
Rafael Chávez (Nicaraguan politician), Mayor of Managua